A PocketQube is a type of miniaturized satellite for space research that usually has a size of 5 cm cubed (one eighth the volume of a CubeSat), has a mass of no more than 250 grams, and typically uses commercial off-the-shelf components for its electronics.

Beginning in 2009, Morehead State University (MSU) and Kentucky Space developed the PocketQube specifications to help universities worldwide to perform space science and exploration. While the bulk of development comes from academia, several companies build PocketQubes, such as Fossa Systems and Alba Orbital. PocketQube projects have even been the subject of Kickstarter campaigns. The PocketQube format is also popular with amateur radio satellite builders.

Design 

The PocketQube specification accomplishes several high-level goals. Simplification makes it possible to design and produce a workable satellite at low cost. Encapsulation of the launcher-payload interface takes away the prohibitive amount of managerial work previously required for mating a piggyback satellite with its launcher. Unification among payloads and launchers enables quick exchanges of payloads and utilization of launch opportunities on short notice. PocketQube is similar to CubeSat in this regard.

The standard was first proposed by Professor Bob Twiggs of Morehead State University, and the intention was for a satellite which could fit in a pocket, hence the name PocketQube.

Workshops 

The first US workshop was held at NASA Ames and at Cape Canaveral in April 2014. There was a three-year gap until the next PocketQube workshop was held at TU Delft in The Netherlands in March 2017. The third workshop took place also at TU Delft in March 2018, with 22 presentations and 70 attendees. This is now an annual event for the PocketQube development community.

Launched 
Listed in ascending order by launch date.

In development

PocketQube vs PocketQub 

The PocketQube standard originally started as PocketQub. This was changed in 2012 by Professor Bob Twiggs of Morehead State University. The standard is now referred to as PocketQube.

Launch 
As of December 2019, the only launch brokers capable of providing launch integration for PocketQube satellites are Fossa Systems, Libre Space Foundation, Alba Orbital and GAUSS Srl.

See also

CubeSat

Notes

References

External links 
 NASA Article on PocketQubes
 Pocketqube Builders
PocketQube Developer Resources

Satellites by type
Morehead State University